Julien Benneteau and Nicolas Mahut were the defending champions, however Benneteau was injured (left wrist).
As a result, Mahut competed with Arnaud Clément. They were eliminated by Gaël Monfils and Josselin Ouanna in the first round.
Stephen Huss and Ross Hutchins won the tournament after defeating Marc López and Eduardo Schwank 6–2, 4–6, [10–7] in the final.

Seeds

Draw

Draw

External links
 Main draw

Doubles